Johann Michael Seligmann (1720–1762) was a German artist and engraver best known for his ornithological artwork in Sammlung verschiedener ausländischer und seltener Vögel (Collection of various foreign and rare birds) of 1749, which included plates based on the works of Mark Catesby and George Edwards. Seligmann received his initial training in engraving and art at the Nürnberger Malerakademie and some of his earlier works included the depictions of various rocks and minerals. His other works included the Opera Botanica 1754 written Konrad Gesner. Many of the copper plates that he made bear the initials JMS.

References

External links

 jjaudubongallery.com
 merianprints.info
 minrec.org

1720 births
1762 deaths
German engravers